Christopher Legreid (January 27, 1857 – April 16, 1944) was a member of the Wisconsin State Assembly.

Biography
Legreid was born on January 27, 1857, in Deerfield, Wisconsin. He later became a blacksmith and manufacturer in Cambridge, Wisconsin. He sold his blacksmith shop to Otto Krull in 1943. Legreid died at his home in 1944.

Political career
Legreid represented the 2nd District of Dane County, Wisconsin in the Assembly during the 1897 session. Other positions he held include member of the Dane County board. He was a Republican.

References

External links
 

People from Cambridge, Wisconsin
Republican Party members of the Wisconsin State Assembly
County supervisors in Wisconsin
American blacksmiths
1857 births
1944 deaths
People from Deerfield, Wisconsin